A Summer Place is a 1959 American romantic drama film based on Sloan Wilson's 1958 novel of the same name, about teenage lovers from different social classes who get back together 20 years later, and then must deal with the passionate love affair of their own teenage children by previous marriages. Delmer Daves directed the movie, which stars Richard Egan and Dorothy McGuire as the middle-aged lovers, and Sandra Dee and Troy Donahue as their respective children. The film contains a memorable instrumental theme composed by Max Steiner, which spent nine weeks at number one on the Billboard Hot 100 singles chart in 1960.

Plot 
Alcoholic Bart Hunter (Arthur Kennedy), his long-suffering wife Sylvia (Dorothy McGuire), and their teenage son Johnny (Troy Donahue) operate a crumbling inn on Pine Island off the Maine coast. The inn was previously Bart's elegant family mansion in an exclusive resort, but as his family fortunes have dwindled, the Hunters are forced to rent rooms to paying guests. Bart receives a reservation request from an old acquaintance, Ken Jorgenson (Egan), who was a lowly lifeguard on the island 20 years ago, but is now a successful research chemist and millionaire. Ken wants to bring his wife and daughter to the island for the summer. Bart suggests that Ken is just coming to lord his new wealth over Bart, who is no longer rich. Bart wants to refuse the reservation, but Sylvia insists that he accept because they badly need the money, even going so far as to move themselves into the small guest house so their own master bedroom suite can be rented to Ken and his family.

Ken arrives with his wife Helen (Constance Ford) and teenage daughter Molly (Sandra Dee). Helen and Ken have an unhappy marriage, sleep in separate bedrooms, and frequently argue, including over proper behavior standards for their daughter. Helen is a prude who disapproves of Molly's developing figure and healthy interest in boys, particularly Johnny Hunter, who is also attracted to Molly. Ken is much more relaxed and permissive, and tells his daughter that her natural desires are not shameful. Helen also tries, unsuccessfully, to put on airs and impress the upper-class residents of the island, while Ken is not interested in pretense and is even happy to talk with older people who remember him from when he worked as a lifeguard.

As it turns out, Ken and Sylvia were lovers 20 years ago, when they were teenagers. It soon becomes apparent that they still love each other and have missed each other for many years, and that Ken returned to Pine Island in hopes of seeing Sylvia again. They had broken up because Ken was a poor college student, while Bart was the son of a rich, established family, so Sylvia married Bart, and Ken, after seeing Sylvia's wedding announcement in the newspaper, married Helen. Both marriages were unhappy, but Ken and Sylvia stayed in them because of their love for their respective children, Molly and Johnny. Ken and Sylvia find themselves drawn to each other again and begin secretly meeting every night. They are soon spotted by the island's night watchman, who informs Helen. Helen initially keeps quiet, on her mother's advice, planning to catch them in the act to ensure a large divorce settlement.

Ken goes on a business trip for a weekend, during which time Molly and Johnny, with Ken's permission, go sailing around the island. Their boat capsizes in rough water, stranding them on the beach overnight. The Coast Guard rescues them the next day, but Helen is suspicious that the teenagers had sex on the beach, although they deny it. Helen sends for a doctor to forcibly examine Molly to make sure she is still a virgin, finding she is. Horrified, Molly runs away and sees Johnny, who threatens to kill Helen if she hurts Molly ever again. Helen contacts law enforcement, and then in a fit of anger, reveals Sylvia and Ken's affair in front of Bart, Ken, Sylvia, and Johnny. Bart reveals he has long known about Sylvia's love for Ken and offers to forgive her, but she cannot go back. The Hunters and Jorgensons each go through an acrimonious public divorce and Molly and Johnny are sent to boarding schools several states apart. Molly and Johnny are angry at Ken and Sylvia and stop speaking to them, becoming increasingly dependent on each other for emotional support, despite Helen's constant interference and criticism of Molly's morals.

Ken and Sylvia eventually marry and move into a Frank Lloyd Wright beach house. They talk Molly and Johnny into visiting them there, to which the teenagers agree largely because it will give them a chance to be together away from Helen, who is unable to prevent the visit due to a court order. During their visit, Molly and Johnny secretly consummate their love. Ken and Sylvia suspect that the teenagers are sleeping together and are concerned about the possible ill effects, but in view of their own past teen history, feel they cannot order Molly and Johnny to stop loving each other. Soon after, Molly discovers she is pregnant and  Johnny and she run away together planning to get married. They seek Bart's blessing, but he is about to be admitted to the veterans' hospital to treat ulcers due to his drinking, and drunkenly tries to talk them out of marriage, later calling Helen to let her know what happened. The local justice of the peace sees they are under legal age to marry, and turns them down. In desperation, Molly and Johnny go to the house of Ken and Sylvia, who are supportive. In the end, happy Johnny and Molly, just married, return to Pine Island for their honeymoon.

Cast 
 Richard Egan as Ken Jorgenson
 Dorothy McGuire as Sylvia Hunter
 Sandra Dee as Molly Jorgenson
 Arthur Kennedy as Bart Hunter
 Troy Donahue as Johnny Hunter
 Constance Ford as Helen Jorgenson
 Beulah Bondi as Mrs. Emily Hamilton Hamble
 Jack Richardson as Claude Andrews
 Martin Eric as Todd Harper

Production 
The film was shot in Pacific Grove and around the Monterey Peninsula. Sloan Wilson wrote the first screenplay, which covered the 22-year span of the novel. Delmer Daves focused the new draft on one year. Daves said:
I have two kids who are just about the same age of these two in A Summer Place and I know how difficult communication between generations can be. And while this may sound corny, it can be assisted by love and understanding. Amid some rather tempestuous social activities, this is what we are trying to demonstrate. That there are two affairs may sound sensational, but that's not the point. We have received the approval of the Johnstone office, because the intent of the picture is a moral one. Frankness and impatience will help pull the cork on a situation blocked by intolerance. What we are trying to do is dramatise that pulling of the cork.

Some exterior and interior scenes involving Ken and Sylvia's beach house were filmed at Frank Lloyd Wright's Mrs. Clinton Walker House, built in 1948. In the film, Sylvia tells Molly that Wright designed the house, ostensibly located on the East Coast near the movie's "Pine Island" location (since Molly and Johnny drive from Pine Island to the house after being sent away by the justice of the peace). In reality, Walker House is located on the beach side of Scenic Road on Carmel Bay in Carmel-by-the-Sea, California. The real house has only one level, although in the movie, the house is depicted as if it has a lower level at the same level as the beach. Additional scenes were filmed at the Honeymoon Cottage located at Mission Ranch in Carmel.

Release and reception 
The movie became popular after its release, but had a mixed critical reception. Harrison's Reports, an industry newsletter for independent movie theater owners, thought it "money in the bank at the box office", "a well-made bit of entertainment" and "sleek and svelte in the best tradition of popular films..." but warned exhibitors the film was "devoted almost exclusively" to sex. Howard Thompson of The New York Times called it "one of the most laboriously and garishly sex-scented movies in years" with "Max Steiner's music hammering away at each sexual nuance like a pile driver". On Rotten Tomatoes, A Summer Place holds an approval rating of 83% based on six reviews, with an average rating of 6.00/10.

"Theme from A Summer Place" 

The 1960 instrumental hit "Theme from A Summer Place", composed by Max Steiner, was used in the film as a secondary musical theme (not the main title theme) for scenes featuring Molly and Johnny. The version used in the film was recorded by Hugo Winterhalter. It was later arranged and recorded by Percy Faith and performed by his orchestra. In 1960, the Percy Faith version reached number one on the Billboard Hot 100 chart for nine consecutive weeks, a record at that time. The theme has been covered in instrumental or vocal versions by numerous other artists, including The Lettermen, Andy Williams, The Chordettes, Cliff Richard, Julie London, Billy Vaughn, Joanie Sommers, and The Ventures, and has been featured in many other films and television programs.  Percy Faith would re-record the piece twice; first in 1969 and later in 1976 prior to his death.

In popular culture 
Troy Donahue co-starred in The Crowded Sky, another Warner Brothers film released about ten months after A Summer Place. In a restaurant scene between Donahue's character and co-star Efrem Zimbalist Jr., the popular "Theme from A Summer Place" is heard on the restaurant sound system.

In the 1971 film The Omega Man, the lead character Robert Neville played by Charlton Heston, listens to the film soundtrack main theme in his car on an 8-track tape cartridge during the precredit opening sequence.

The lyrics of the song "Look At Me, I'm Sandra Dee" from the musical Grease are in part specifically about the events in this movie.

The film is part of a plot point in the Barry Levinson 1982 film Diner. Set in 1959, the character "Boogie" and several of his friends attend a movie theater showing of A Summer Place, where Boogie plays a sexual prank on his date as Molly and Johnny kiss onscreen.

The 1985 Canadian film My American Cousin, set in 1959, plays the song a number of times.

The 'I washed my hair for you scene' can be seen on the 1990s show Lois & Clark: The New Adventures of Superman in the first-season episode: "Honeymoon in Metropolis". Lois is spending the weekend at the Lexor hotel in town for relaxation but is getting bored with the love stories being shown on television.

The 1997 thriller-comedy Con Air features the song during a scene in which a character played by Dave Chappelle is thrown out of an airplane.

The 2001 version of Ocean's Eleven contains the theme from A Summer Place during the initial scene between Daniel Ocean (George Clooney) and Tess (Julia Roberts).

The theme song is used in a comedic scene of two separate seductions in National Lampoon's 1978 blockbuster comedy, "Animal House".

See also 
 List of American films of 1959

References

External links 
 
 
 
 
 
 

1950s American films
1950s English-language films
1950s teen films
1959 films
1959 romantic drama films
Adultery in films
American coming-of-age films
American romantic drama films
American teen romance films
Beach party films
Cultural depictions of Frank Lloyd Wright
Films based on American novels
Films directed by Delmer Daves
Films scored by Max Steiner
Films set in Maine
Films set on fictional islands
Films shot in California
Teenage pregnancy in film